Quiet Lake is a lake in Yukon, Canada that is 28 kilometers in length and the largest lake of the three Big Salmon River system lakes. It was named in 1887 by John McCormack, a gold prospector. Prior to the construction of the South Canol road, which was completed in the 1940s, the area was mostly reached by boating hundreds of miles up the Big Salmon, Teslin or Nisutlin rivers.

See also
List of lakes in Yukon

References

 National Resources Canada Mapping Services. Geographical Names of Canada. Accessed September 2010.

Lakes of Yukon